Sir Peter Henry Gross, PC (born 13 February 1952) is a retired judge of the Court of Appeal of England and Wales.

Gross was called to the Bar in 1977 (Gray's Inn). He became a Queen's Counsel in 1992. Gross was appointed a Recorder in 1995 and a Deputy High Court judge in 1999. In 2001, he was appointed to High Court, receiving the customary knighthood, and was assigned to the Queen's Bench Division. He served as presiding judge on the South East Circuit from 2004 to 2004, and headed the Commercial Court from 2009 to 2010. 

On 9 July 2010, Gross became a Lord Justice of Appeal, and was appointed to the Privy Council in 2011. He became Deputy Senior Presiding Judge on 3 October 2011, and was Senior Presiding Judge for England and Wales from 1 January 2013 to 31 December 2015.

See also
 List of Lords Justices of Appeal

References

1952 births
British King's Counsel
Living people
Members of the Privy Council of the United Kingdom
Knights Bachelor
Members of Gray's Inn
Lords Justices of Appeal
University of Cape Town alumni
Alumni of Oriel College, Oxford
South African Rhodes Scholars
Queen's Bench Division judges
Alumni of Herzlia High School